Castle Rising is a village and civil parish in the English county of Norfolk. The River Babingley skirts the north of the village separating Castle Rising from the site of the lost village of Babingley.

History
Castle Rising's name is of Norman and Anglo-Saxon origin, deriving from a mix of the Old English and Norman French for a castle close to the settlement of Risa's people.

In the Domesday Book, Rising is listed as a settlement of fourteen households in the hundred of Grimshoe. The village was owned by William de Warenne.

Castle Rising Castle was built in the 1140s on the orders of William d'Aubigny and was most famously the residence of Queen Isabella after her role in the murder of King Edward II. The castle was subsequently passed to Edward of Woodstock and is now in the possession of Greville Howard.

Prior to the Reform Act of 1832, Castle Rising was a parliamentary borough yet due to its small population it was often labelled as an example of a rotten borough. Samuel Pepys was the member for Castle Rising between 1673 and 1679 as was Robert Walpole between 1701 and 1702

Geography
In the 2011 Census, Castle Rising was reported as having 216 residents living in 116 households.

Castle Rising lies within the constituency of North West Norfolk and is thus represented by James Wild MP of the Conservative Party at Parliament.

St. Lawrence's Church
Castle Rising's Parish Church is of Norman origin and is dedicated to Saint Lawrence. The font dates from the Twelfth Century yet the church was heavily restored in the Nineteenth Century by Anthony Salvin and George Edmund Street.

In Popular Culture
Castle Rising appeared as a Danish village in Out of Africa.

Castle Rising was also the setting for Grass, a 2003 spin-off of The Fast Show.

Notable Residents
 William d'Aubigny, 1st Earl of Arundel- Norman nobleman
 Adeliza of Louvain- Queen of England
 William d'Aubigny, 2nd Earl of Arundel- Anglo-Norman nobleman
 Isabella of France- Queen of England
 Greville Howard, Baron Howard of Rising- British politician

War Memorial
Castle Rising's War Memorials take the form of two metal plaques on two lanterns in the High Street. They bear the following names for the First World War:
 Corporal Arthur R. Chivers (d.1918), 10th Battalion, Tank Corps
 Private George Twaite (d.1917), 6th Battalion, Royal East Kent Regiment
 Private Eric J. Marsters (d.1915), 1/5th Battalion, Royal Norfolk Regiment
 Private Josiah Cooper (1885-1916), 9th Battalion, York and Lancaster Regiment

And, the following for the Second World War:
 Gunner Albert D. Ward (1921-1942), 65th (Norfolk Yeomanry) Anti-Tank Regiment
 Private Hubert A. Bocking (1915-1944), 4th Battalion, Royal Norfolk Regiment

References

External links

.

 
Villages in Norfolk
Civil parishes in Norfolk
King's Lynn and West Norfolk